Boxhagener Platz is a 2010 German comedy film directed by Matti Geschonneck. The film premiered at the 2010 Berlin International Film Festival. In late 2010, it was put on a shortlist, with eight other films, for the Academy Award for Best Foreign Language Film.

Cast

References

External links 

2010 films
2010 comedy films
German comedy films
Films set in 1968
Films set in East Germany
Films set in Berlin
2010s German films